Karosas is a Lithuanian surname. Notable people with the surname include:

 Gintaras Karosas (born 1968), Lithuanian artist
 Tadas Karosas (born 1964), Lithuanian businessman and serial entrepreneur

Lithuanian-language surnames